The New Zhijiang Army, also known as the Xi Jinping faction, is a term used by observers to represent political figures in the Chinese Communist Party who are closely related to CCP general secretary Xi Jinping, most prominently those who held important provincial and local posts during Xi Jinping's term as Communist Party Secretary of Zhejiang province. The "new army" refers to people who were closely associated with Xi and identifies with his political views, and who have since then taken on prominent political posts at the provincial level or in central party and state organs.

The term was first widely used by Ma Haoliang, editor at Hong Kong-based newspaper Ta Kung Pao in an article entitled the New Zhijiang Army of Chinese Politics. The term Zhijiang refers to the Qiantang River, which runs through the province, but is often used as a poetic reference for the greater Zhejiang region. The term was initially used as title to Xi Jinping's book Zhijiang Xinyu, a book compiling the political philosophies of Xi Jinping during his five-year term as party chief of Zhejiang, published in 2007.

The people close to Xi Jinping have also been referred to as "Xi Clan".

Suggested members

Others
Other politicians have been named by Chinese-language media as associates of Xi Jinping. They have known or worked under him as a result of their regional tenures in Shaanxi province (Xi's "home province"), the southeast (Zhejiang and Fujian provinces), or through Tsinghua University, where Xi spent time in his youth. Those named include Wang Qishan, Li Zhanshu, Liu He, Chen Xi, He Yiting, Wang Xiaohong, Li Shulei, and Huang Xingguo (since disgraced). In the military, Liu Yuan, Zhang Youxia, and Liu Yazhou have been named as some of Xi's top associates.

See also
Shanghai clique
Tuanpai
Hu Jintao's departure from the 20th National Congress of the Chinese Communist Party

References

Factions of the Chinese Communist Party
Zhejiang